Hard Boiled is a 1926 American silent Western film directed by John G. Blystone and starring Tom Mix, Helene Chadwick and Heinie Conklin.

Cast
 Tom Mix as Tom Bouden 
 Helene Chadwick as Marjorie Gregg 
 Heinie Conklin as Bill Grimes 
 Phyllis Haver as Justine Morton 
 W.E. Lawrence as Gordon Andrews 
 Emily Fitzroy as Abigail Gregg 
 Dan Mason as Abrue Boyden 
 Spec O'Donnell as Eddie Blix
 Ethel Grey Terry as Mrs. Sarah Morton 
 Eddie Sturgis as First Crook 
 Eddie Boland as Second Crook
 Emmett Wagner as Third Crook

References

Bibliography
 Solomon, Aubrey. The Fox Film Corporation, 1915-1935: A History and Filmography. McFarland, 2011.

External links
 

1926 films
1926 Western (genre) films
Fox Film films
Films directed by John G. Blystone
American black-and-white films
Silent American Western (genre) films
1920s English-language films
1920s American films